The 2003 Jacksonville Jaguars season was the franchise's 9th season in the National Football League and the 1st under head coach Jack Del Rio. The Jaguars failed to improve upon their 6–10 regular season record in 2002 and failed to make the playoffs for the fourth season in a row. An 0–8 record in road games eliminated any chance of postseason play.

Oddly, despite being in existence since 1995, this season marked the first time that the Jaguars played the San Diego Chargers. This is due to old NFL scheduling formulas in place prior to 2002; the Jaguars had played the Chargers’ division rivals the Kansas City Chiefs four times; the Denver Broncos three times and the Oakland Raiders twice (though not since 1997).

Week 3 was Mark Brunell’s last game as a Jaguar, as he was benched forcing rookie quarterback Byron Leftwich to take his spot for the rest of the season. Brunell left the team at the end of the season.

Jacksonville defeated New Orleans 20–19 in the week 16 game despite the River City Relay, a play that has gone down in NFL lore.

Offseason

Acquisitions 
During free agency, the Jaguars signed former Philadelphia Eagles defensive end Hugh Douglas and former indianapolis Colts linebacker Mike Peterson.

Draft

Staff

Roster

Schedule 

Note: Intra-division opponents are in bold text.

Standings

References 

Jacksonville Jaguars
Jacksonville Jaguars seasons
Jackson